Shanghaied may refer to:

Shanghaiing, or forced conscription
Shanghaied (1915 film), a film starring Charlie Chaplin
Shanghaied (1927 film), a 1927 American silent film
Shanghaied (1934 film), an animated short film starring Mickey Mouse
"Shanghaied" (SpongeBob SquarePants), an episode of the animated cartoon series SpongeBob SquarePants
"Shanghaied", a song by Chinese language R&B singer David Tao from his 2003 album UltraSound
Shanghaied in Astoria, a 1984 musical melodrama
 Shanghaied Love, a 1931 American film